YouWin is a youth development scheme, established in Nigeria by Goodluck Jonathan’s government, with the aim of empowering Nigerian youth by providing grants to small business owners. It is run as a competition, where entrants submit their business plans which are then evaluated by the Enterprise Development Center of the Pan-African University. Winners receive up to N10 million (around $64,000), paid in instalments, subject to adherence to the submitted plan. The program is a private and public initiative that finances outstanding business-plans for young entrepreneurs in Nigeria.

History
The program was launched in Nigeria in 2011 at the presidential villa. YouWin! is an acronym, which stands for Youth Enterprise With Innovation in Nigeria. The program is a joint product of four government ministries: the Federal Ministry of Finance, Ministry of Communication and Technology, Ministry of Education and Youth Development, and the Ministry of Women Affairs. The goal of this program is to meet the projection of the government towards enhancing 3600 entrepreneurship youths in the country.

The phases of YouWin
The first edition, tagged YouWin!1, was intended as a job creation scheme, by funding youth entrepreneurial projects. The second edition, YouWin!2, was an affirmative action project, specifically targeting women below the age of 45. It awarded grants to over 1200 women. The third edition, YouWin!3, was open to all genders, with a record number of awardees (over 2500).

The working of the program
The fund granted by YouWin! is an equity contribution to the business of selected awardees. Such a person, aside being a Nigerian youth, must have a business plan for a registered company with the Corporate Affairs Commission in Nigeria. The fund disbursement is designated through any of the participating commercial banks in Nigeria

In June 2016, the Federal Government, through the Ministry of Finance, said that it would consult with beneficiaries and other concerned parties on restructuring the multi-billion Naira Youth Enterprise with Innovation in Nigeria through the YouWin! programme, with the objective of injecting new ideas for its sustainability. As follow-up, the Director of Information at the ministry, Salisu Dambatta, issued a statement saying that a weekly print media enterprise education programme designed to assist entrepreneurs start, plan and grow their businesses would be launched soon. It would be launched by the Youth Enterprise With Innovation in Nigeria (YouWiN!Connect). It added that the publication would be syndicated in five national newspapers. 

Since inception, the programme has midwifed 3,900 enterprises but needs enhancement to ensure sustainability. This has influenced the redesign to YouWiN!Connect, which takes YouWin! to the next level, as a multi-media enterprise education initiative that will provide the tools and skills required to support the emergence of the next generation of successful Nigerian-owned enterprises across the nation.

Members of the advisory board include the Finance Minister, Kemi Adeosun, the Minister of State, Industry, Trade and Investment, Aisha Abubakar, the founder and C.E.O of House of Tara International and pioneer of the bridal make-up profession in Nigeria, Tara Fela-Durotoye, Former Banker and current MD/CEO of L & Z Integrated Farms, Alhaji M.D. Abubakar, Founders of the Prince Ebeano Supermarket chain, Sunday Egede and David Chukwuma Ojei, The founder and Managing Director of Sankore Investments and Venture Capitalist, Titi Odunfa Adeoye and the Managing Director of the new Development Bank of Nigeria

References

External links
 

Youth in Nigeria
Business incubators of Nigeria